Stenidiocerus is a genus of true bugs belonging to the family Cicadellidae.

The species of this genus are found in Europe and Northern America.

Species:
 Stenidiocerus poecilus (Herrich-Schäffer, 1835)

References

Cicadellidae
Hemiptera genera